Jacques van de Werve de Vorsselaer (born 1 October 1915) is a Belgian nobleman of the Houses of Werve and Vorsselaer.

Family
He is the son of Fernand and Blanche Marie Julie de Lichtervelde.
 
He married Béatrice de Faestraets (1925-2002) on 30 September 1947, and their children are:
 Marie-Antoinette van de Werve de Vorsselaer (b. 3 August 1948)
 Married: Etienne Cornet d' Elzius de Peissant
 Isabelle van de Werve de Vorsselaer (b. 22 August 1949)
 Léon van de Werve de Vorsselaer
 Married: Anne Gonze
 Nathalie van de Werve de Vorsselaer (b. 20 April 1954)
 Married: Paul Moens de Hase
 Yolande van de Werve de Vorsselaer (b. 13 June 1956)
 Married: Benoît Speeckaert

References 

van de Werve
Belgian nobility